{{Infobox CBB Team
|current = 2022–23 Arkansas State Red Wolves men's basketball team
|name = Arkansas State Red Wolves
|logo = Arkansas State Red Wolves wordmark.svg
|logo_size = 250
|university = Arkansas State University
|conference = Sun Belt
|location = Jonesboro, Arkansas
|coach = Vacant
|tenure = 
|arena = First National Bank Arena
|capacity = 10,563
|nickname = Red Wolves
|NCAAchampion =
|NCAAfinalfour = 
|NCAAtourneys = Division I1999

Division II1958, 1960, 1962, 1963, 1966, 1967''
|conference_tournament = 1999
|conference_season = 1971, 1974, 1991, 1998
|h_body=cc092f
|h_pattern_b=_thinsidesonwhite
|h_shorts=cc092f
|h_pattern_s=_blanksides2
|a_body=cc092f
|a_pattern_b=_thinwhitesides
|a_shorts=cc092f
|a_pattern_s=_whitesides
|3_body=000000
|3_pattern_b=_thinredsides
|3_shorts=000000
|3_pattern_s=_redsides
}}

The Arkansas State Red Wolves men's basketball team represents Arkansas State University in Jonesboro, Arkansas, United States. The school's team currently competes in the Sun Belt Conference. They play their home games at the First National Bank Arena. They are led by head coach Mike Balado, who took over on March 19, 2017.

Postseason results

NCAA Division I Tournament results
The Red Wolves have appeared in one NCAA Division I Tournament. Their record is 0–1.

NCAA Division II Tournament results
The Red Wolves have appeared in six NCAA Division II Tournaments. Their combined record is 5–7.

NAIA Tournament results
The Red Wolves have appeared in two NAIA Tournaments. Their combined record is 0–2.

NIT results
The Red Wolves have appeared in the National Invitation Tournament (NIT) four times. Their combined record is 4–4.

Notable players
Red Wolves in the NBA
Arkansas State has had 3 former players who have gone on to play in the NBA.

Conference players of the year

 Southland Conference POY Jerry Rook (1964, 1965)
 John Dickson (1966)
 Allan Pruett (1971)
 Steve Brooks (1974)
 Dan Henderson (1977)

 Sun Belt Conference POY'''
 Jeff Clifton (1994)
 Chico Fletcher (1998, 1999)
 Norchad Omier (2022)

References

External links